Finsterwalder is a German language word meaning 'dark forests'. Finsterwalder is a German aircraft manufacturer.

Finsterwalder may also refer to:

Aircraft
Finsterwalder Funfex, a German high-wing, single-place, hang glider, designed and produced by Finsterwalder
Finsterwalder Perfex,  a German high-wing, single-place, hang glider, designed and produced by Finsterwalder
Finsterwalder Speedfex,  a German high-wing, single-place, hang glider, designed and produced by Finsterwalder

Places
Finsterwalder Glacier, a glacier in Antarctica

People with the surname
Frauke Finsterwalder (born 1975), German film director and screenwriter
Sebastian Finsterwalder (1862–1951), pioneered the use of repeat photography as a temporal surveying instrument in photogrammetry of alpine glaciers
 (born 1963), German geodesist, cartographer and university professor

See also
Finsterwald